WVBH (88.3 FM, "Reach Gospel Radio") is a radio station licensed to Beach Haven West, New Jersey serving the Monmouth/Ocean radio market. The station is owned by Priority Radio, Inc.  It airs an urban gospel format rebroadcasting WXHL-FM from Newark, Delaware.

The station was assigned the WVBH call letters by the Federal Communications Commission on April 28, 2000.

The Call letters stand for "Voice of Beach Haven".

Coverage area
The station covers Ocean and northern Atlantic Counties in New Jersey on 88.3 FM.

The WVBH antenna is co-located with WBBO-FM and WCHR-FM on a tower located near the intersection of Route 72 and the Garden State Parkway in Manahawkin.

Ownership
In November 2003, Priority Radio Inc. reached a deal to acquire the construction permit for WVBH from JC Radio Inc. The reported sale price was $400,000.

Previous logo

References

External links
WVBH official website

Gospel radio stations in the United States
Ocean County, New Jersey
Radio stations established in 2000
VBH
2000 establishments in New Jersey